Kedestes malua is a butterfly in the family Hesperiidae. It is found in north-eastern Zambia.

References

Butterflies described in 1910
m
Endemic fauna of Zambia
Butterflies of Africa